Count Georg Ludwig Cancrin (16 November 1774 – 10 September 1845) was a Russian German aristocrat and as a politician best known for spearheading reforms in the Russian financial system early in the 19th century.

Biography
Cancrin was born in Hanau.

In 1797, at the age of 23, Cancrin accompanied his father, the mineralogist Franz Ludwig von Cancrin, to Russia, joining the imperial service and changing his name to Georg.

In 1823, at the age of 49, Cancrin was appointed Minister of Finance and held that office for 21 years. As a politician, Cancrin was a conservative who opposed the construction of railways and the emancipation of the serfs.

Cancrin died in Pavlovsk.

Legacy
In 1827, Cancrin wrote Alexander von Humboldt, the famous Prussian scientist, asking if he would visit Russia at the monarchy's expense to identify areas where Russia could develop economically. Although Russia had played a major role in defeating the armies of Napoleon, in the postwar period Russia's position in the world had not risen and potentially Humboldt's visit could identify mining areas to exploit. The Russian government had already invited experts in mining from Germany and France for this task, perhaps not surprising since Cancrin's father, a mining expert himself, had come to Russia for similar reasons.  From April to December 1829, Humboldt traveled through Russia, reaching the Chinese border in the east and the Caspian Sea in the south, before returning to St Petersburg.  Cancrin had taken pains to guarantee the success of Humboldt's trip, arranging for his expenses to be paid as well as assuring the cooperation of Russian officialdom. "I shall not fail to send instructions to all governors and mining officials, with orders to put you up. Customs will be instructed to facilitate your entry into Russia." Humboldt accurately predicted that diamonds would be found in the Ural Mountains. Cancrin had initially contacted Humboldt to get his opinion about the feasibility of using Russian platinum in coinage. Humboldt recommended against it.

In 1839 cancrinite, named after the Minister of Finance, was found in the Ural Mountains.

Among Cancrin's writings, The Military Economy (published in German) is the best regarded.

Cancrin's policies often sought to maintain the status quo due to the limitations of the Russian government in carrying out large scale economic reform. His policies have been characterized as being aimed at reducing budget deficits through curtailment of government expenditure rather than attempts at stimulating the economy.  He advanced loans to the gentry class in order to preserve, in the words of historian Walter Pintner, "the social status quo".  With a view toward limiting state expenditure, he refused to credit the Russian industry, thus eliminating the budget deficits that plagued the Russian economy for decades. Private banks were forbidden, and he took steps was to stymie the development of capitalism.

Financial reforms of 1839–1843
Cancrin's major achievement was the monetary reform of 1839–43 which sanitized the Russian fiscal system. The reform started with the issue of a new silver ruble equal to 3.5 of the older Assignation ruble. Then, based on the silver rubles, new deposit notes were issued. Finally, the old Assignation rubles were removed from circulation in 1843, and replaced with the new banknotes. These reforms stabilized the Russian financial system considerably.

References

External links 

1774 births
1845 deaths
People from Hanau
Economists from the Russian Empire
German economists
Counts of the Russian Empire
Finance ministers of Russia
Politicians of the Russian Empire
Members of the State Council (Russian Empire)